Macra na Feirme (officially meaning "Stalwarts of the land") is an Irish voluntary rural youth organisation. The organisation provides a social outlet for members in sport, travel, public speaking, performing arts, community involvement and agriculture.

History
It was founded in 1944 by Stephen Cullinan, a rural science teacher. The organisation's original purpose was to provide young farmers with adequate training to ensure their livelihood and to provide an outlet for socialising in rural areas.

Macra na Feirme has been involved in the establishment of:
 Irish Farmers Journal
 Irish Creamery Milk Suppliers Associateion
 Macra na Tuaithe (now Foróige)
 National Farmers' Association (now the Irish Farmers' Association)
 Farm Apprenticeship Scheme
 Irish Farm Accounts Co-op (IFAC Accountants)
 National Co-operative Farm Relief services Ltd

Since its foundation, over 250,000 young people have passed through the ranks of Macra na Feirme.

As of August 2016, Macra na Feirme had approximately 8,000 members in clubs around Ireland. Approximately one-third of Macra members are directly involved in farming, with males making up 60% of the membership and females 40%. Macra is a democratic organisation, with membership representation at club, regional and national levels.

See also
Blue Jean Country Queen Festival
Queen of the Land Festival

References

External links

1944 establishments in Ireland
Agricultural organisations based in Ireland
Agrarianism in Ireland